"Rain or Shine" is a 1986 hit single by British pop group Five Star. Peaking at #2 on the UK Singles Chart, it was held off the top spot for two weeks by British pop band The Communards with the year's biggest selling song, "Don't Leave Me This Way". "Rain or Shine" spent a total of 13 weeks inside the UK Top 75, five of those in the Top 10.

Track listings
7" single and 7" poster sleeve:

1. "Rain Or Shine" (with extra intro)

2. "Summer Groove"

12" single: PT40902

1. "Rain Or Shine" (Remix) (Phil Harding PWL Mix) 5:55 *

2. "Rain Or Shine" (Dub) (Phil Harding PWL Mix)

3. "Summer Groove"

4. "Find The Time" (Instrumental Remix) (Shep Pettibone Mix)

All tracks available on the remastered versions of either the 2010 'Silk & Steel' album, the 2013 'The Remix Anthology (The Remixes 1984-1991)' or the 2018 'Luxury - The Definitive Anthology 1984-1991' boxset.

* But... the "Rain Or Shine" (Remix) on the 2010 remastered Silk & Steel CD album has some audible imperfections.

However on the 2011 compilation Phil Harding Club Mixes of the 80s, there is a digitally remastered and restored version of "Rain Or Shine" (Remix) sourced from the original studio master tapes and is therefore a much higher quality version of this track.

External links
 

Five Star songs
1986 songs
1986 singles
Songs with lyrics by Peter Sinfield
Songs written by Billy Livsey